In the 2020–21 season, ES Sétif is competing in the Ligue 1 for the 51st season, as well as the Algerian Cup. It is their 25th consecutive season in the top flight of Algerian football. They will be competing in Ligue 1 and the Confederation Cup.

Squad list
Players and squad numbers last updated on 15 November 2020.Note: Flags indicate national team as has been defined under FIFA eligibility rules. Players may hold more than one non-FIFA nationality.

Competitions

Overview

{| class="wikitable" style="text-align: center"
|-
!rowspan=2|Competition
!colspan=8|Record
!rowspan=2|Started round
!rowspan=2|Final position / round
!rowspan=2|First match
!rowspan=2|Last match
|-
!
!
!
!
!
!
!
!
|-
| Ligue 1

| 
| style="background:silver;"|Runners-up
| 28 November 2020
| 24 August 2021
|-
| League Cup

| colspan=2| Round of 16
| colspan=2| 8 May 2021
|-
| Confederation Cup

| Preliminary round
| Group stage
| 14 February 2021
| 28 April 2021
|-
! Total

Ligue 1

League table

Results summary

Results by round

Matches
On 22 October 2020, the Algerian Ligue Professionnelle 1 fixtures were announced.

Algerian League Cup

Confederation Cup

First round

Play-off round

Group stage

Group A

Squad information

Playing statistics

|-
! colspan=12 style=background:#dcdcdc; text-align:center| Goalkeepers

|-
! colspan=12 style=background:#dcdcdc; text-align:center| Defenders

|-
! colspan=12 style=background:#dcdcdc; text-align:center| Midfielders

|-
! colspan=12 style=background:#dcdcdc; text-align:center| Forwards

|-
! colspan=12 style=background:#dcdcdc; text-align:center| Players transferred out during the season

Goalscorers
Includes all competitive matches. The list is sorted alphabetically by surname when total goals are equal.

Transfers

In

Out

New contracts

Notes

References

2020-21
Algerian football clubs 2020–21 season